"Midnight City" is a 2011 song by M83.

Midnight City may also refer to:

 Midnight City, a video game company owned by Majesco Entertainment
 "Midnight City", a season 3 episode of Arrow